Monther Rayahneh (also spelt Mondher Rayahneh) (born 8 April 1979 in Irbid) is a Jordanian actor. After studying Dramatic Arts in Yarmouk University, he participated in several TV dramas. He became famous for his roles as knight or prince in Bedouin and Historical series.
He received best actor award in Cairo Arab Media Festival  for his role as " Awda Abou Taya".

He was one of the cast of the TV series "Al Ijtiyah - الاجتياح" (The Invasion) that won an International Emmy Award in the Telenovella category.

References

1979 births
Living people
Yarmouk University alumni
People from Irbid
Jordanian male film actors
Jordanian male stage actors
Jordanian male television actors